Keep On Truckin'  is an American comedy/variety series that aired on American Broadcasting Company from July 12, 1975 to August 2, 1975. Each episode was to have been introduced by Rod Serling, but he died of a heart attack two weeks before the series premiere and his pre-taped introductions were omitted from the telecasts.

Regulars
Franklyn Ajaye
Rhonda Bates
Dick Van Dyke
Kathrine Baumann
Jannine Burnier
Scott Baio
Didi Conn
Charles Fleischer
Anson Williams
Wayland Flowers
Mike Lookinland
Larruy Ragland
Buddy Handleson
Marion Ramsey
Ted McGinley
Rhilo Fahir
Jack Riley
Fred Travalena
Gailard Sartain
Richard Lee Sung

References
 

1975 American television series debuts
1975 American television series endings
American Broadcasting Company original programming
1970s American musical comedy television series